Ivan Kasutin (born October 17, 1986) is a Russian professional ice hockey goaltender who currently plays for Metallurg Novokuznetsk in the Supreme Hockey League (VHL). He has previously played as a journeyman with nine clubs within the Kontinental Hockey League (KHL).

References

External links

1986 births
Living people
Ak Bars Kazan players
HC CSKA Moscow players
HC Lada Togliatti players
Metallurg Novokuznetsk players
HC Neftekhimik Nizhnekamsk players
Severstal Cherepovets players
SKA Saint Petersburg players
HC Spartak Moscow players
Torpedo Nizhny Novgorod players
HC Vityaz players
Russian ice hockey goaltenders